Cezar Washington Alves Portela (born 16 November 1986) is a Brazilian footballer who plays for Esportivo as a midfielder.

Career

Club
Washington signed for Brasil de Pelotas in June 2012 to play in 2012 Campeonato Brasileiro Série D, having previously played in Campeonato Gaúcho with Canoas and São José-PA. After four seasons with the club, which saw two promotions, he joined Nagoya Grampus in the J2 League in November 2016. On 29 June 2018, Washington's contract with Nagoya Grampus was cancelled by mutual consent. After leaving Nagoya Grampus, Washington signed for Renofa Yamaguchi on 27 July 2018.

Washington returned to Brazil for a second spell with Brasil de Pelotas in 2019, making his debut at the end of January after a period waiting for his registration to be completed.

Career statistics

Club

References

External links

1986 births
Living people
Association football defenders
Brazilian footballers
Brazilian expatriate footballers
Campeonato Brasileiro Série B players
Campeonato Brasileiro Série C players
Campeonato Brasileiro Série D players
J1 League players
J2 League players
Canoas Sport Club players
Esporte Clube São José players
Grêmio Esportivo Brasil players
Nagoya Grampus players
Renofa Yamaguchi FC players
Expatriate footballers in Japan
Sportspeople from Recife